The Alliance Conducted at Sea was a political alliance in Chinese history between the Song and Jin dynasties in the early 12th century against the Liao dynasty. The alliance was negotiated from 1115 to 1123 by envoys who crossed the Bohai Sea.  Under the alliance, the two nations agreed to jointly invade the Liao, split captured territories, and cede the Sixteen Prefectures to the Song, and forswore making unilateral peace with the Liao. In 1121-23, the Song faltered in their military campaigns but the Jin succeeded in driving remnants of the Liao imperial court to Central Asia where they formed the Western Liao dynasty. The Jin handed over several of the Sixteen Prefectures to the Song including modern-day Beijing.  In 1125, the alliance ended when the Jin, sensing Song weakness, invaded southward and eventually captured the Song capital of Kaifeng in 1127.

See also
History of the Song dynasty
Jin–Song Wars
Treaty of Shaoxing
Timeline of the Jin–Song Wars
History of Beijing

Citations

Bibliography
 (hardcover);  (paperback).

Jin–Song Wars
Khitan history